Soundar Rajan is an Indian cinematographer who has worked in the Tamil, Telugu and Malayalam film industries.

Early life 
Soundar Rajan was born in Uthiramerur, Tamil Nadu to Saranathan and Chandra. His childhood days were spent in Kancheepuram.
He graduated with Bachelor's degree in Visual Communications from Loyola College.

Career
Soundar Rajan completed a degree in Visual Communications at Loyola College, Chennai before approaching P. C. Sreeram for work experience. Sreeram recommended him to K. V. Anand, who accepted him as an assistant, and they subsequently worked on films including Nerukku Ner (1997), Mudhalvan (1999) and Josh (2000), before continuing as an apprentice till Khakee (2004). Soundar Rajan made his debut as a lead cinematographer with Sukran (2005), before going on to work on Kana Kandaen (2005), directed by his mentor K. V. Anand. He was also given an opportunity by director Shankar to shoot Chimbu Deven's Arai En 305-il Kadavul (2008).

He is an acclaimed ad film cinematographer with more than 3000 ad films to his credit. He has since worked on Telugu films including the fantasy film, Anaganaga O Dheerudu (2011), where he worked extensively on visual effects for the first time. Soundar Rajan also then continued work on Tamil films including a collaboration with Anand again in Maattrraan (2012), where Suriya portrayed conjoined twins and the crew used up to five different techniques to get the desired illusion on screen. He also won critical acclaim for his work in the bilingual Vaayai Moodi Pesavum (2014) for his depiction of a fictional hill town. In 2017, he won critical acclaim for his work in Lakshman's action film Bogan.

Personal life
Soundar Rajan married Anusha on 11 December 2005. They have two children.

Filmography

As cinematographer

As guest cinematographer

As associate cinematographer

As actor 
 Bogan (2017)

Behind the Scenes
 Goutham Nanda
 Romeo Juliet
 Isai
 Bengal Tiger- Raaye Raaye song
 Charlie Chaplin 2

References

External links
 

Living people
Malayalam film cinematographers
Telugu film cinematographers
Tamil film cinematographers
People from Kanchipuram district
21st-century Indian photographers
Cinematographers from Tamil Nadu
1976 births